Boppin' & Burnin' is an album by organist Don Patterson recorded in 1968 and released on the Prestige label.

Reception

Scott Yanow of Allmusic says in his review of the album that "the repertoire is particularly strong" with Patterson soloing first on all 5 tracks.

Track listing 
All compositions by Howard McGhee except where noted.
 "Pisces Soul" – 13:58  
 "Donna Lee" (Charlie Parker) – 6:15  
 "Island Fantasy" – 6:39  
 "Epistrophy" (Kenny Clarke, Thelonious Monk) – 5:09  
 "Now's the Time" (Charlie Parker) – 7:37

Personnel 
Don Patterson – organ
Howard McGhee – trumpet
Charles McPherson – alto saxophone (tracks 1, 3-5)
Pat Martino – guitar
Billy James – drums

References 

Don Patterson (organist) albums
1968 albums
Prestige Records albums
Albums produced by Don Schlitten